Born This Way is an American reality television series produced by Bunim/Murray Productions featuring seven adults with Down syndrome who work hard to achieve goals and overcome obstacles. The show received a Television Academy Honor in 2016.

On August 22, 2019, it was announced that the series will end with a six-part short form digital series titled Born This Way: Moving Forward which premiered on December 13, 2019 and a one-hour linear series finale holiday special titled A Very Born This Way Christmas which premiered on December 18, 2019.

Cast
Rachel Osterbach brightens up any room she's in, especially the office of the insurance company where she works. A bit boy crazy, she counts herself among Adam Lambert's biggest fans. Rachel is quick to develop a crush and seeks a serious romantic relationship of her own.
Sean McElwee is a self-professed "ladies' man." But beneath a seemingly singular focus on "babes" lies a multi-talented athlete and a caring friend. Sean is the focus of three books written by his mother, Sandra, detailing Sean's journey navigating the school system and beyond. With his parents downsizing and moving to a new home, Sean strives to gain greater independence and one day live on his own.
John Tucker is an entertainer through and through, always expressing himself through his music, writing, and dance. He is a particularly adept rapper, working diligently on his debut album, "JT: The Project." Anchored by his mother, Joyce, his large family supports him in all of his creative endeavors. John seeks to take his music to the next level.
Steven Clark has a rare form of Down syndrome known as Mosaic Down syndrome, meaning not every cell in his body carries the extra 21st chromosome. As such, he doesn't have all of the same characteristics of a typical person with DS. Growing up, Steven often felt like he was somewhere "in the middle" and strives to fit in.
Cristina Sanz is a romantic and has been in a relationship with her husband, Angel Callahan, for six years. Her close-knit family hails from Spain, and Cristina enjoys learning the language and cooking traditional Spanish meals. She hopes to continue to take her relationship to the next level and have an independent life with Angel.
Megan Bomgaars gained widespread notice after creating a video entitled "Don't Limit Me," and now speaks at events around the country, spreading her message of inclusion. She also manages a tie dye clothing company called "Megology." Her mother, Kris, is known as her "Dream Maker," and the two are an inseparable pair.
Elena Ashmore was born in Japan to a Japanese mother, Hiromi, and an Australian father, Stephen, and this multi-cultural influence has carried throughout her life. She enjoys practicing traditional Japanese Taiko drumming and cooking. Elena has often struggled with accepting herself and her disability. Her personal conflicts inspire the other cast members to examine their own self-images and ideas of what it means to be an adult with Down syndrome.

Episodes

Series overview

Season 1 (2015–16)

Season 2 (2016)

Season 3 (2017)

Season 4 (2018)

Awards and nominations

References

External links

2015 American television series debuts
2019 American television series endings
A&E (TV network) original programming
2010s American reality television series
Down syndrome in television
Television series by Bunim/Murray Productions
Television shows set in Los Angeles
Primetime Emmy Award for Outstanding Reality Program winners
Television Academy Honors winners